Fabian Kling (born 24 July 1987) is a German former professional footballer who played as a defender or midfielder.

Career

College and Amateur
Kling played his college soccer at Fort Lewis College, where he amassed 86 appearances and scored 28 goals. During his time at Fort Lewis, Kling earned honors such as NSCAA Division II National Player of the Year, Defensive Most Outstanding Player of the NCAA Division II Final Four, All-NCAA Division II Final Four Team, NSCAA/Continental Tire All-America first team, Daktronics All-America first team and NSCAA All-Central Region first team in 2011, Fort Lewis Most Valuable Player, Third team NSCAA/Performance Subaru All-America, Third team Daktronics All-America, First team NSCAA/Performance Subaru All-Central Region in 2010, All-NCAA Division II Final Four Team, First team NSCAA All-Central Region, Second team Daktronics All-Central Region in 2009 and First team All-RMAC in 2008.

Kling also spent time with German club TSV Rain/Lech during his summer breaks from college, who play in the Bayernliga.

Professional
Kling was drafted in the second round of the 2012 MLS Supplemental Draft (30th overall) by Chivas USA, but wasn't signed by the club. He also trialled with The Championship club Reading in February 2012.

Kling signed with expansion side San Antonio Scorpions of the North American Soccer League on 16 March 2012. He made his professional debut with the club on 8 April 2012 in a 0–0 draw against Atlanta Silverbacks.

References

External links
 Skyhawks profile

1987 births
Living people
Sportspeople from Augsburg
German footballers
Footballers from Bavaria
Association football defenders
Association football midfielders
Fort Lewis Skyhawks men's soccer players
San Antonio Scorpions players
Fort Lauderdale Strikers players
North American Soccer League players
Chivas USA draft picks
German expatriate footballers
German expatriate sportspeople in the United States
Expatriate soccer players in the United States